David Pierce Jr. (March 26, 1786August 16, 1872) was a Vermont lawyer and politician who served State Auditor and as a state court judge.

Biography
Pierce was born in Southboro, Massachusetts March 26, 1786 and raised in Barnard, Vermont.

He graduated from Dartmouth College in 1811.  He then taught school, studied law with Charles Marsh, was admitted to the bar in 1816 and established a law practice in Woodstock, Vermont.

Pierce was also interested in inventing and other scientific pursuits, and items he patented include a gold separator, a planing machine and a method for constructing watertight ship's holds.

In 1823 Pierce was elected State Auditor, and he served until 1845.

Pierce was named a judge of the court of common pleas in 1836, and he served until 1846.

He died in Woodstock on August 16, 1872.  He was buried at River Street Cemetery in Woodstock.

References

1786 births
1872 deaths
Dartmouth College alumni
State Auditors of Vermont
Vermont lawyers
People from Woodstock, Vermont
People from Southborough, Massachusetts
Vermont state court judges
Burials in Vermont
19th-century American judges
19th-century American lawyers